Zartaj Gul (Pashto) is a Pakistani politician who served as Minister of State for Climate Change, in Imran Khan ministry between 5 October 2018 and 10 April 2022 after Imran Khan was ousted by No-confidence motion against Imran Khan. She remained a member of the National Assembly of Pakistan between August 2018 and January 2023.

Early life and education
Gul hails from North Waziristan, born on 17 October 1984 Khyber Pakhtunkhwa to Ahmad Wazir, chief engineer of WAPDA and belongs to Wazir tribe.

She obtained her early education in her native town Bannu and Miramshah before moving to Lahore with her family. She attended Queen Mary College for her undergraduate studies and then National College of Arts for her postgraduate studies. She did Textile Designing from National College of Arts.

After completing her education, she joined Pakistan Tehreek-e-Insaf (PTI) and became a volunteer with Insaf Student Forum (ISF) in 2005.

She moved to Dera Ghazi Khan after getting married in 2010.

Political career
Gul ran for the seat of the National Assembly of Pakistan as a candidate of PTI from Constituency NA-172 (Dera Ghazi Khan-II) in 2013 Pakistani general election but was unsuccessful. She received 38,643 against 49,142 votes of Hafiz Abdul Kareemand lost the seat.

She was elected to the National Assembly as a candidate of PTI from NA-191 (Dera Ghazi Khan-III) in 2018 Pakistani general election. She received 79,817 votes and defeated Awais Leghari.

On 5 October 2018, she was inducted into the federal cabinet of Prime Minister Imran Khan and was appointed as Minister of State for Climate Change.

Controversy
In June 2019, Gul was criticized by the media for allegedly using her position to influence NACTA in the appointment of her sister in the authority. Prime Minister Imran Khan took notice of the situation. However, NACTA clarified that appointment of Zartaj Gul was totally based on merit and there was no nepotism involved in the case.

References

Living people
Pashtun women
Pakistani MNAs 2018–2023
Pakistan Tehreek-e-Insaf MNAs
Imran Khan administration
1984 births
Queen Mary College, Lahore alumni
National College of Arts alumni
Government ministers of Pakistan
Women members of the National Assembly of Pakistan
21st-century Pakistani women politicians